Sichuan Airlines Flight 8633 was a flight from Chongqing Jiangbei International Airport to Lhasa Gonggar Airport on 14 May 2018, which was forced to make an emergency landing at Chengdu Shuangliu International Airport after the cockpit windshield failed. The aircraft involved was an Airbus A319-100. The incident was adapted into the 2019 film The Captain.

Aircraft and crew
Sichuan Airlines Flight 8633 was being operated by an Airbus A319-133, serial number 4660, registration B-6419. It first flew on 11 July 2011 following roll-out from Airbus Tianjin final assembly line, and was delivered to Sichuan Airlines on the 26th of the same month. It was powered by two IAE V2524-A5 engines. As of 14 May 2018, the aircraft had recorded more than  flight hours and  cycles before the incident. In addition to the 3 pilots, the jetliner also carried 6 cabin crew and 119 passengers.

The pilots were: pilot-in-command Liu Chuanjian (45), second-in-command Liang Peng, and First Officer Xu Ruichen (27). Before Liu joined Sichuan Airlines in 2006, he worked as a flight instructor for ten years in Sichuan's Second Aviation College of People's Liberation Army Air Force.

Incident
On 14 May 2018, Flight 8633 took off from Chongqing Jiangbei International Airport at 6:25 CST (22:25 UTC). As a result of the sudden decompression, the flight control unit was damaged, and the loud external noise made spoken communications impossible. The co-pilot however, was able to use the transponder to squawk 7700, alerting Chengdu Shuangliu International Airport control about their situation. Because the flight was within a mountainous region, the pilots were unable to descend to the required 8,000 ft (2,400 m) to compensate for the loss of cabin pressure.

About 35 minutes later, the jetliner made an emergency landing at 7:42 CST (23:42 UTC) at Chengdu Shuangliu International Airport. The aircraft was overweight on landing. As a result, the plane took a longer distance to come to a stop and the tires burst.

Despite wearing a seatbelt, first officer Xu was partially sucked out of the aircraft. He suffered facial abrasions, a minor right eye injury and a sprained wrist. One of the flight attendants on the aircraft, Zhou Yanwen, also suffered a wrist injury and received treatment. Owing to the insulation design of the Airbus A319, the temperature did not drop immediately for the passengers, despite the cockpit's exposure to the outside environment, saving them from frostbite. The flight crew remained conscious and did not experience hypoxia or frostbite. No other crew member or passenger was injured.

Investigations 

The incident was investigated by the Civil Aviation Administration of China, Airbus and Sichuan Airlines. In accordance with the Chicago Convention on International Civil Aviation's Annex 13 regulation, Airbus refrains from any further comments on their progress. On 2 June 2020, the final report was released. The root cause of the accident was damage to the seal on the right-hand side windshield, causing moisture to penetrate and remain in the cavity on the bottom edge of the windshield. The insulation of wires in the windshield heating system was reduced after being soaked for a long time, causing continuous  arc discharges at the bottom left corner of the windshield. This led to local high temperatures and breakage of the double-layer structure of the windshield. As a result, the windshield could no longer withstand the pressure difference between inside and outside the cockpit and burst off from the fuselage.

Aftermath 
The crew of Sichuan Airlines Flight 8633 were hailed as heroes by the public media and the captain, Liu Chuanjian was given a prize of 5 million yuan (£569,400).

The crew and pilots continue to work for Sichuan Airlines and the airline continues to keep flight 3U8633 in operation, flying the same route. The aircraft B-6419 was repaired and returned to service with Sichuan Airlines on 18 January 2019.

In popular culture
The incident was adapted into the film The Captain, directed by Andrew Lau. The film, released during the 70th anniversary of the People's Republic of China in 2019, ranked second at the box office during the national holiday.

The incident was also featured in season 23, episode 6 of the Canadian documentary series Mayday, titled "Cockpit Catastrophe".

See also
British Airways Flight 5390, a similar incident

References

External links 

 Final report of this accident by Civil Aviation Administration of China 
 - via VASAviation
Accident description at the Aviation Safety Network

2018 in China
Aviation accidents and incidents in China
Aviation accidents and incidents in 2018
Accidents and incidents involving the Airbus A319
Airliner accidents and incidents involving in-flight depressurization
May 2018 events in China
History of Sichuan